Vangjel Adhami (born 1948) is an Albanian chess player, five-times Albanian Chess Championship winner (1966, 1971, 1972, 1985, 2000).

Biography
From the begin to 1970s to the begin 2000s Vangjel Adhami was one of Albania's leading chess players. He five times won Albanian Chess Championship: 1966, 1971, 1972, 1985, and 2000.

Vangjel Adhami played for Albania in the Chess Olympiads:
 In 1970, at fourth board in the 19th Chess Olympiad in Siegen (+5, =2, -4),
 In 1972, at third board in the 20th Chess Olympiad in Skopje (+3, =3, -0),
 In 1980, at second board in the 24th Chess Olympiad in La Valletta (+4, =3, -3),
 In 1988, at first reserve board in the 28th Chess Olympiad in Thessaloniki (+1, =1, -2),
 In 2000, at second board in the 34th Chess Olympiad in Istanbul (+1, =2, -5).

Vangjel Adhami played for Albania in the European Team Chess Championship preliminaries:
 In 1977, at second board in the 6th European Team Chess Championship preliminaries (+2, =0, -1).

Vangjel Adhami played for Albania in the Men's Chess Balkaniads:
 In 1980, at second board in the 12th Chess Balkaniad in Istanbul (+0, =3, -2),
 In 1993, at second board in the 24th Chess Balkaniad in Ankara (+0, =1, -3).

References

External links
 
 
 Vangjel Adhami chess games at 365chess.com

1948 births
Living people
Albanian chess players
Chess Olympiad competitors
20th-century chess players